Rashomon is a 1950 Japanese film directed by Akira Kurosawa.

Rashomon, Rashōmon or Rajōmon may also refer to:

Locations
 Rajōmon can refer to either of two city gates, one in Nara and the other in Kyoto. Kurosawa's Rashomon is named after the Kyoto gate.
 Rashōmon (stalactite) (ja) a cave feature in Niimi, Japan

Films
 Rashōmon (1911 film) – featuring Matsunosuke Onoe, one of nearly 1,000 films this actor made in 3 years

Music
 Rashomon (album), an album by Taiwanese singer Show Luo in 2010
 Rashōmon (Ningen Isu album) (ja) album by the Japanese heavy metal band Ningen Isu (The Human Chairs)
 Rashomon (song) (zh), a cantopop song by Hong Kong singers Juno Mak and Kay Tse in 2015

Theatre
 Rashōmon (Noh play) (c. 1420), a famous Noh play about a man ascending the gate to find a demon
 Rashomon (play), a 1959 English-language play written by Fay and Michael Kanin, based on Kurosawa's film.
 Rashomon (Thai play) a 1973 Thai-language play composed by the famous Thai writer and politician Kukrit Pramoj, based on Kurosawa's film
 Rashomon (opera), a 1996 English-language chamber opera by Argentine composer Alejandro Viñao, based on Kurosawa's film

Literature
 "Rashōmon" (short story), a short story by Ryūnosuke Akutagawa first published in 1915
 Rashomon Gate: A Mystery of Ancient Japan, a 2002 novel written by I. J. Parker
 Police Station Rashōmon (ja) manga by Masao Yajima and Akira Nakayama, and then a TV drama based on it

Other uses
 Rashōmon (sake) (ja) a Japanese sake brand from Wakayama

See also
Rashomon effect, a psychological effect named by Karl G. Heider.